Pierre Remond de Montmort was a French mathematician.  He was born in Paris on 27 October 1678 and died there on 7 October 1719. His name was originally just Pierre Remond. His father pressured him to study law, but he rebelled and travelled to England and Germany, returning to France in 1699 when, upon receiving a large inheritance from his father, he bought an estate and took the name de Montmort. He was friendly with several other notable mathematicians, and especially Nicholas Bernoulli, who collaborated with him while visiting his estate. He was elected a fellow of the Royal Society in 1715, while traveling again to England, and became a member of the French Academy of Sciences in 1716.

De Montmort is known for his book on probability and games of chance, Essay d'analyse sur les jeux de hazard, which was also the first to introduce the combinatorial study of derangements. He is also known for naming Pascal's triangle after Blaise Pascal, calling it "Table de M. Pascal pour les combinaisons."

Another of de Montmort's interests was the subject of finite differences. He determined in 1713 the sum of n terms of a finite series of the form

where Δ is the forward difference operator, a theorem which seems to have been independently rediscovered by Goldbach in 1718.

References

External links 

 

 

 

 

This article incorporates text from a public domain source.

1678 births
1719 deaths
18th-century French mathematicians
French Roman Catholics
Fellows of the Royal Society
Members of the French Academy of Sciences